The Mexico national badminton team represents Mexico in international badminton team competitions and is controlled by the Mexican Badminton Federation. Mexico competed in the Sudirman Cup four times from 1991 until 2001.

The Mexico men's team qualified for their first Thomas Cup in 2016 after winning the 2016 Pan Am Team Badminton Championships after beating Canada in the gold medal tie with a score of 3–0. The team later debuted in the 2016 Thomas Cup. The team were eliminated in the group stages and finished in 16th place.

The Mexico women's team also achieved a podium position, finishing third place at the 2016 Pan Am Team Badminton Championships. The mixed team finished third twice in 1993 and 2009. The Mexico team also participates in the Pan American Games and has won four bronze medals in badminton at the Games.

Participation in BWF competitions

Thomas Cup

Sudirman Cup

Participation in Pan American Badminton Championships

Men's team

Mixed team

Current squad 
The following players were selected to represent Mexico at the 2022 Pan Am Male & Female Badminton Cup.

Men
Andrés López
Job Castillo
Armando Gaitán
Luis Ramon Garrido
Sebastian Martínez Cardoso
Luis Armando Montoya Navarro
Rodrigo Morales
Lino Muñoz
Gerardo Saavedra

Women
Jessica Jazmin Bautista Trigueros
Romina Fregoso
Haramara Gaitán
Vanessa Maricela Garcia Contreras
Paula Lozoya
Fatima Rio
Miriam Jacqueline Rodriguez Pérez
Sabrina Solis

References

Badminton
National badminton teams
Badminton in Mexico